Marie of the Isles (French: Marie des Isles, Italian: I flibustieri della Martinica) is a 1959 French-Italian historical adventure film directed by Georges Combret and starring Belinda Lee, Alain Saury and  Darío Moreno.

It was also known as The Wild and the Wanton.

Plot 
In 1635, Jacques du Parquet, the nephew of the well known explorer Belain d'Esnambic, enters a tavern in Dieppe, and falls in love with the daughter of the bartender, Marie Bonnard. He knows his noble family would disapprove such a marriage; besides, he is nominated for the post of governor in Martinica. He promised never to forget Marie, but as time goes by, she will accept to marry a rich and unscrupulous man, Monsieur de Saint-André. When her husband is appointed to serve in Martinica as General Commissioner, Marie demands to go with him. At her arrival, all sorts of trouble arrive: pirates take action against travelers and goods, rotten deals set the two officers against each other, and finally jealousy settles to make things worse. Written by Artemis-9 ( from Imdb.com )

Main cast 

 Belinda Lee as Marie Bonnard  
 Alain Saury as Jacques du Parquet 
 Darío Moreno as Desmarais – le traître  
 Magali Noël as Julie  
 Folco Lulli as Le capitaine Le Fort  
 Jacques Castelot as Le comte Cheneau de Saint-André  
 Noël Roquevert as Barracuda – le pirate  
 Philippe Hersent as Baillardel  
 Jean Clarieux as Le moine  
 Charles Bouillaud as Un excité  
 Alexandre Rignault as Bonnard  
 Luciano Benetti as La Perrière  
 Jean Tissier as Le père Hampteau

Production
The film was based on a novel by Robert Gaillard about the real life Jacques Dyel du Parquet which sold over 150,000 copies in France. The novel was published in the US, the first of Gaillard's novels to be so.

Belinda Lee's casting was announced in March 1959. It was one of a series of biographical roles she played in Europe.

Magali Noel fractured her ankle during filming in August.

References

Bibliography
 Philippe Rège. Encyclopedia of French Film Directors, Volume 1. Scarecrow Press, 2009.

External links

Marie of the Isles at Letterbox DVD
Marie of the Isles at BFI

1959 films
1950s historical adventure films
French historical adventure films
Italian historical adventure films
1950s French-language films
Films directed by Georges Combret
Films set in the 1630s
Films set in France
1950s Italian films
1950s French films